Cameron Young (born March 24, 1996) is an American professional basketball player for the NBA G League Ignite of the NBA G League. He played college basketball for the Quinnipiac Bobcats after playing two years at Arizona Western College. Young was named the Metro Atlantic Athletic Conference Player of the Year for the 2018–19 season.

College career
After a high school career at Westchester High School in Los Angeles, Young moved to junior college Arizona Western, where he was named first-team Arizona Community College Athletic Conference as a sophomore. Young signed with Quinnipiac as his four-year college. Young's first season at Quinnipiac consisted of only six minutes as he found himself on coach Tom Moore’s bench. He would later be granted another year of eligibility by the National Collegiate Athletic Association (NCAA).

Young's next season was saved as new head coach Baker Dunleavy inserted Young into the starting lineup. Young responded, averaging 18.8 points a game for the Bobcats and earning second-team All-Metro Atlantic Athletic Conference (MAAC) honors. Following his fifth year of eligibility being reinstated, Young entered the 2018–19 season as the leading returning scorer in the MAAC and a preseason first-team All-MAAC selection. In a February 18, 2019 game, Young scored 55 points against Siena. The total marked a MAAC and Quinnipiac Division I record and was the most points scored in an NCAA Division I game since North Dakota State’s Ben Woodside scored 60 in 2008. Young led the Bobcats to an 11–7 MAAC record and at the close of the season was named the MAAC Player of the Year and a first-team All-MAAC pick.

Professional career

Cantù (2019–2020)
After going undrafted in the 2019 NBA draft, Young signed his first professional contract with Italian club Pallacanestro Cantù of the Lega Basket Serie A.

Cherkaski Mavpy (2021)
On February 25, 2021, Young signed with Cherkaski Mavpy in the Ukrainian Basketball SuperLeague. He scored a season-high 23 points in a 79-88 loss to BC Ternopil.

South Bay Lakers (2021)
On October 23, 2021, Young signed with the South Bay Lakers of the NBA G League after a successful tryout. However, he was waived at the end of training camp.

Memphis Hustle (2021–2022)
On December 5, 2021, Young was signed by the Memphis Hustle. He averaged 17.3 points, 4.2 rebounds and 1.7 assists per game.

Cleveland Charge (2022)
On February 24, 2022, Young was traded from the Memphis Hustle to the Cleveland Charge in exchange for Dwayne Sutton and the rights to Levi Randolph.

NBA G League Ignite (2022–present)
On September 28, 2022, Young signed with the NBA G League Ignite.

Career statistics

Professional

|-
| align="left" |  2019–20
| align="left" | Pallacanestro Cantù
| Lega Basket Serie A2
| 20 || 22.2 || .364 || .283 || .725 || 2.6 || 1.2 || .6 || .2 || 9.5
|-
| align="left" |  2020–21
| align="left" | Cherkaski Mavpy
| Ukrainian SuperLeague
| 21 || 25.3 || .457 || .369 || .782 || 2.3 || 1.2 || .9 || .7 || 13.8
|-
|-class=sortbottom
| align="center" colspan=2 | Career
| All Leagues
| 41 || 23.8 || .417 || .318 || .760 || 2.5 || 1.2 || .7 || .5 || 11.7

References

External links
Quinnipiac Bobcats bio
College stats @ sports-reference.com
EuroBasket Profile

1996 births
Living people
American expatriate basketball people in Italy
American expatriate basketball people in Ukraine
American men's basketball players
Arizona Western Matadors men's basketball players
Basketball players from Inglewood, California
Basketball players from Los Angeles
Cleveland Charge players
Lega Basket Serie A players
Memphis Hustle players
NBA G League Ignite players
Pallacanestro Cantù players
Quinnipiac Bobcats men's basketball players
Shooting guards